Vertical and horizontal are concepts, and may refer to:
 Vertical and horizontal, a concept in mathematics, geography, physics and other sciences
 Vertical and horizontal integration, a concept in economics
 Vertical and horizontal markets (disambiguation), another concept in economics
 Vertical and horizontal writing in East Asian scripts, Asian writing systems
 Vertical and horizontal bundles, mathematical fiber bundles